Patricia Godman (née Leonard; 31 October 1939 – 21 July 2019) was a Scottish Labour politician who served as Deputy Presiding Officer of the Scottish Parliament from 2003 to 2011. She was the Member of the Scottish Parliament (MSP) for the West Renfrewshire constituency from 1999 to 2011.

Background
The daughter of Martin Leonard and Cathie Craig, Godman was a Glasgow City councillor before entering the Scottish Parliament.

After leaving St Gerard's Senior Secondary School, Glasgow aged 15, Godman worked with a charity for some time, as a waitress, in a bar, insurance collector and a house mother in a list 'D' school. She later attended Jordanhill College where she trained as a social worker. She worked as a social worker working in the East End of Glasgow from 1979 to 1989.

From 2003 until 2011, Godman was a Deputy Presiding Officer of the Scottish Parliament. In 2008, it was revealed she charged the taxpayer around £30,000 for hotel bills although she was renting a flat from her son Gary Mulgrew. She did not qualify for the rental expenses allowance as her main residence in Glasgow was too close to Holyrood to qualify, but claimed rent rather than hotel expenses. She was entitled to an overnight expenses allowance that permitted MSPs to recoup expenses for each night, which she had paid for the rent of the apartment. It was confirmed that she had neither broken the Parliamentary rules, nor benefited in any way.

On her final day in parliament, Godman wore a Celtic F. C. shirt in Holyrood. A few days later, a bomb addressed to her office was intercepted, with similar devices being sent to Celtic manager Neil Lennon and Paul McBride, Lennon's legal representative. It was believed that Godman was targeted for wearing the shirt. Trevor Muirhead and Neil McKenzie were later convicted for sending the bombs.

Personal life
Godman married her second husband Norman Godman in 1981, who was a Member of Parliament for Greenock and Inverclyde and its predecessor seat from 1983 to 2001. She had three sons by her first husband, whom she separated from aged 22 due to his infidelity. One, Gary Mulgrew, was one of the NatWest Three. Her experience with his extradition inspired her to take an active role in opposing Gary McKinnon's extradition to the United States in a similar case.

Godman died on 21 July 2019 in Clydebank, after fighting with a terminal illness.

References

External links 
 

1939 births
2019 deaths
People from Govan
Scottish social workers
Scottish Labour councillors
Female members of the Scottish Parliament
Labour MSPs
Members of the Scottish Parliament 1999–2003
Members of the Scottish Parliament 2003–2007
Members of the Scottish Parliament 2007–2011
Deputy Presiding Officers of the Scottish Parliament
20th-century Scottish women politicians
Women councillors in Glasgow